CIBK-FM (98.5 Virgin Radio) is a Top 40/CHR radio station based in Calgary, Alberta, Canada. The Bell Media outlet operates at 98.5 FM with an effective radiated power of 100 kW from a transmitter located at the intersection of Old Banff Coach Road and 85 Street Southwest, and its studios located at CTV studios on Patina Rise.

As of Winter 2020, CIBK is the 16th-most-listened-to radio station in the Calgary market according to a PPM data report released by Numeris.

History
The station received approval by the CRTC in 2001. When CIBK made its debut on September 6, 2002 as Vibe 98.5, they thought they would become the city's first R&B/hip hop outlet, but they were beaten to the punch by CKIS by about a month. This would spark a format war in Calgary, with both stations making potshots at one another. On April 1, 2003, CKIS would bail out and abruptly change to the "Jack FM" format, leaving CIBK as the victor.

However, CIBK would also go through an evolution of its own as they transitioned to a rhythmic contemporary direction by 2003, and to their current mainstream Top 40 direction by 2004. CIBK still played R&B/hip hop product (although at a reduced rate), and also incorporated pop and dance into the mix, in part due to its license with the CRTC that now requires the station to be programmed as a Top 40/CHR outlet. Because CIBK was anticipated for years prior to its launch to be Calgary's long-awaited urban station, it had faced much criticism for bailing out to a Top 40 format leaving many of the station's hip-hop/R&B fans disappointed and let down by Standard.

CIBK was part of the acquisition of most of the assets of Standard Broadcasting by Astral Media that was completed on October 29, 2007. Under Astral, CIBK dropped the rhythmic lean.

On April 1, 2010, Astral Media registered the domain names, VirginRadio985.com, Virgin985.com and VirginCalgary.com, which many speculated would be a branding change for CIBK to become a part of the Virgin Radio branding in Canada. This was confirmed on the Vibe Morning Show's June 23, 2010 broadcast, and the rebranding took place on June 30 at Noon, and will retain its Top 40 format. It is the second Virgin Radio station with a mainstream Top 40 format after Toronto's CKFM-FM. The last song on "Vibe" was "Goodbye" by Kristinia DeBarge, while the first song on "Virgin" was "California Gurls" by Katy Perry.

CIBK-FM is the longest-tenured Top 40/CHR station in Alberta still having the format today, only Edmonton's CKNG-FM (now adult hits since 2004) had the longest-tenured format from 1991-2003.

As part of the merger of Astral and Bell Media approved by the CRTC on June 27, 2013, CIBK is now owned by Bell Media.

References

External links
98.5 Virgin Radio
 

Ibk
Ibk
Ibk
Virgin Radio
Radio stations established in 2002
2002 establishments in Alberta